George West House is a historic home located at 801 NY-29 in Rock City Falls in Saratoga County, New York.  It was built in 1866 for prominent industrialist and congressman George West, known as the "Paper Bag King" for his invention of the folded paper bag.

The house is a two-story, wood-framed hipped-roofed residence in the Italian Villa style.  It features a projecting full-height entrance pavilion and an ornate, flat-roofed entrance portico. It also has an enclosed, hip-roofed belvedere with decorative finials situated at the center of the roof. Also on the property is a contributing carriage barn and corncrib.

It was added to the National Register of Historic Places in 2005.

References

External links

Houses on the National Register of Historic Places in New York (state)
Italianate architecture in New York (state)
Houses completed in 1866
Houses in Saratoga County, New York
1866 establishments in New York (state)
National Register of Historic Places in Saratoga County, New York